Christophe Chevrier (born 28 August 1963) is a French rowing coxswain. He competed in the men's coxed pair event at the 1984 Summer Olympics.

References

External links
 

1963 births
Living people
French male rowers
Olympic rowers of France
Rowers at the 1984 Summer Olympics
Place of birth missing (living people)
Coxswains (rowing)